Statistics of Ekstraklasa for the 1968–69 season.

Overview
It was contested by 14 teams, and Legia Warsaw won the championship.

League table

Results

Top goalscorers

References
 Poland – List of final tables at RSSSF 

Ekstraklasa seasons
1968–69 in Polish football
Pol